Yalunka may refer to:
the Yalunka people
the Yalunka language